Aslan Vladimirovich Mashukov (born 4 November 1984) is a Russian football official and a former player. He is the director with PFC Spartak Nalchik.

External links
 

1984 births
Living people
Russian footballers
PFC Spartak Nalchik players
Russian Premier League players
FC Spartak Vladikavkaz players
FC Volgar Astrakhan players
FC Fakel Voronezh players
Association football midfielders